Romeo Franz (born 28 October 1966) is a German musician, human rights activist and politician of Alliance 90/The Greens who has been serving as a Member of the European Parliament since 3 July 2018. From 2003 until 2013, he was a board member of the Central Council of German Sinti and Roma.

In addition to his committee assignments, Franz is a member of the European Parliament Intergroup on LGBT Rights and the European Parliament Anti-Racism and Diversity Intergroup.

References

External links

Living people
MEPs for Germany 2014–2019
MEPs for Germany 2019–2024
Alliance 90/The Greens MEPs
1966 births